The following lists events that happened in 1993 in Iceland.

Incumbents
President – Vigdís Finnbogadóttir 
Prime Minister – Davíð Oddsson

Events

Births

2 February – María Ólafsdóttir, singer and actress
11 February – Hörður Björgvin Magnússon, footballer
7 March – Sigtryggur Arnar Björnsson, basketball player
9 March – Stony, actor, hip-hop artist, singer, drummer and producer
19 April – Hólmbert Friðjónsson, footballer
26 April – Kristján Emilsson, footballer
30 April – Arnór Ingvi Traustason, footballer.
10 May – Katrín Davíðsdóttir, CrossFit athlete
22 July – Emil Atlason, footballer
8 October – Aron Sigurðarson, footballer
18 December – Anton Sveinn McKee, swimmer.

Full date missing
Birna Berg Haraldsdóttir, handball player
María Guðmundsdóttir, alpine skier

Deaths
16 January – Jón Páll Sigmarsson, strongman, powerlifter and bodybuilder (b. 1960).

23 December – Sveinbjörn Beinteinsson, religious leader (b. 1924)

References

 
1990s in Iceland
Iceland
Iceland
Years of the 20th century in Iceland